The term BMW 1600 may refer to:

 an automobile produced as part of the BMW New Class range
 an automobile produced as part of the BMW 02 Series

1600